Sørnes is a village in Sola municipality in Rogaland county, Norway. The village is a part of the larger Stavanger/Sandnes metropolitan area. The village lies just west of the European route E39 highway and just a short distance north of the village of Solakrossen.

A large proportion of the population commutes to work in nearby Stavanger. The village is named after the old Sørnes farm. The first element is suđr which means "southern" and the last element is nes which means "headland".

References

Sola, Norway
Villages in Rogaland
Jæren